David Gáč (born 20 April 1999) is a retired Czech footballer who played as a centre back.

Club career

FC Zbrojovka Brno
He made his professional debut for Zbrojovka Brno in the away match against Mladá Boleslav on 10 September 2017, which ended in a loss 0:3.

References

External links
 Profile at FC Zbrojovka Brno official site
 Profile at fotbal.idnes.cz
 

1998 births
Living people
Czech footballers
Czech expatriate footballers
Association football defenders
FC Zbrojovka Brno players
FK Frýdek-Místek players
FK Fotbal Třinec players
FK Senica players
1. SK Prostějov players
Czech First League players
Czech National Football League players
Slovak Super Liga players
Expatriate footballers in Slovakia
Czech expatriate sportspeople in Slovakia